Mormugao is a seaport city situated in the eponymous Mormugao taluka (municipality) of the South district, in the Goa state, India. It has a deep natural harbour and remains Goa's chief port.

Towards the end of the Indo-Portuguese era in 1917, thirty-one settlements were carved out of the Salcette area, to form Morumugão with Mormugao seaport as its headquarters. The remaining thirty-five settlements were retained in Salcette which encompass the present-day Salcete taluka with Margao as its headquarters.

Geography
It has an average elevation of 2 metres (7 feet).

Demographics and Healthcare
 India census, Mormugao had a population of 97,085. Males constitute 53% of the population and females 47%. Mormugao has an average literacy rate of 75%, higher than the national average of 59.5%: male literacy is 80%, and female literacy is 70%. In Mormugão, 11% of the population is under 6 years of age. Konkani being the state language, Marathi, Kannada, Hindi and English are also spoken.

The Directorate of health services Goa ( DHS) provides secondary level of healthcare to the people of mormugao and nearby places through the erstwhile Chicalim Cottage Hospital at Alto Chicalim now upgraded to the level of Sub District Hospital with 120 beds. The DHS also provides Primary Health Care to the taluka through PHC Casaulim,  PHC Cortalim and UHC Vasco. A number of private nursing homes, clinics, panchkarma centers, gyms  and physiotherapy centers can also be found in the subdistrict.

History

When the Portuguese colonised part of Goa in the sixteenth century, they based their operations in the central district of Tiswadi, notably in the international emporium 'City of Goa', now Old Goa. As threats to their maritime supremacy increased, they built forts on various hillocks, especially along the coast. In 1624, they began to build their fortified town on the headland overlooking Mormugao harbour.

The sultans of Bijapur, who had ruled Goa before the Portuguese, did not give up easily. There were several invasions. From the sea came the Dutch, who eventually took over from the Portuguese most of the coastal settlements: the Moluccas, Batticaloa, Trincomali, Galle, Malacca, Manar, Jaffna, Quilon, Cochin and Cannanore. From 1640 to 1643, the Dutch tried their best to capture Mormugão but were finally driven away.

In 1683, the Portuguese in Goa were in grave danger from the Marathas. Almost certain defeat was averted when Sambhaji suddenly lifted siege and rushed to defend his own kingdom from the Mughal Emperor Aurangzeb. The narrow escape, no less than the decline of the City of Goa, convinced the Portuguese viceroy, Dom Francisco de Távora, that he should shift the capital of the Portuguese holdings in India to Mormugao's formidable fortress.

In 1685, the new city's principal edifices were under construction, with the Jesuit priest Father Teotónio Rebelo in charge. The Jesuit architects made a consistent effort to avoid the ornate style of the time. The austere viceregal palace still stands, having been used, after its short stint as a palace, in various capacities, including as the hotel which housed the British agents who in 1943 destroyed German ships anchored in Mormugao's neutral waters. Viceroys after Távora found Mormugao too secluded for their liking. The administrative headquarters were moved to the new city of Panjim, which is till today Goa's chief city.

During World War II, the harbour of Mormugao was the site of Operation Creek, which resulted in the bombing of a German merchant ship, Ehrenfels, which had secretly been transmitting information to U-boats.

Mormugao Port

Ever since it was accorded the status of a Major Port in 1963, the Mormugao port has contributed immensely to growth of maritime trade in India. It is the leading iron ore exporting port of India with an annual throughput of around 27.33 million tonnes of iron ore traffic.

The INS Mormugao has been named after the port.

Transport links

Epidemics devastated Mormugao during the eighteenth century, but after that its fortunes turned.  As the importance of one of India's best natural harbours grew more apparent, Mormugao, which the British called Marmagoa, became a key trading point. It was chosen for the terminus of the new metre gauge railway linking the Portuguese colony to British India. For a fabulous price, the Western India Portuguese Guaranteed Railways Company, a British enterprise, modernised the port and built the railway. Both were opened to the public in July 1886.

Mormugao's city of Vasco da Gama was planned and built in the early years of the twentieth century.  A colourful city of officials, traders and migrant labourers, it had its Portuguese academies and British club life for several decades.  Now rather scarred, Mormugão district continues to be unique in Goa.

With Goa's airport at Dabolim, the railway terminus at Vasco da Gama, and the busy port, Mormugao is many visitors’ first experience of Goa.

Politics
The area is part of the South Goa (Lok Sabha constituency) (also known as Mormugão (Lok Sabha constituency) ). In the 2019 Lok sabha elections, the South Goa Lok Sabha constituency was again won by Francisco Sardinha of Indian National Congress defeating Narendra Keshav Sawaikar of Bharatiya Janata Party, though Sawaikar had managed to gain lead in all 4 lok sabha constituencies of Mormugao.

Mormugao taluka also elects 4 MLAs to the Goa State Assembly. The current MLAs  are Alina Saldanha from Cortalim (Goa Assembly constituency), Carlos Almeida from Vasco Da Gama (Vidhan Sabha constituency),  Milind Naik from Mormugao (Goa Assembly constituency) and Mauvin Godinho from Dabolim (Goa Assembly constituency) all from the Bharatiya Janata Party.

Climate

Education
Mormugao has many schools of repute which provides quality education to the residents in and around Vasco-da-Gama. Murgaon Education Society was established in 1971 with the noble goal of providing educational facilities at Vasco-da-Gama and in other parts of Murgaon Taluka. Mormugao Educational Society's College of Arts and Commerce locally known as MES College is a famous institution situated in Zuarinagar, which provides higher education in Arts and Commerce along with Birla Institute of Science and Technology (BITS) that caters to university level of education in the fields of engineering and medicine.

See also

 Ports in India
 Mormugao Port Trust

References

 
Cities and towns in South Goa district
Port cities in India
Islands of India
Populated places in India